Rubberweed is a common name that may refer to any of several plants in the daisy family, Asteraceae, including:

 Genus Hymenoxys, the rubberweeds or bitterweeds
 Ericameria nana, also known as dwarf goldenbush

Asteraceae